The JobStairs GIESSEN 46ers (formerly GIESSEN 46ers) is a professional basketball club based in Gießen, Germany, that plays in the Basketball Bundesliga. Their home arena is Sporthalle Gießen-Ost, with a capacity of 4,003 people.

History
The biggest achievements in club history are five German Championships (1965, 1967, 1968, 1975, 1978). Besides that, the 46ers have won the German Cup three times (1969, 1973, 1979). The most recent achievements were an appearance in the BBL semi-finals in 2005, when the team lost the series 1–3, to the eventual champion GHP Bamberg, and the third place in the BBL Cup in 2006.

In the 2012–13 season, the 46ers relegated from the Bundesliga for the first time. In the 2014–15 season, they were crowned the ProA champions and promoted back to the highest tier.

They are known in the USA, for having been the team for which professional wrestler Kevin Nash (also known as Diesel) finished his professional basketball career, due to a knee injury.

Honours
German Championship
Winners: 1965, 1967, 1968, 1975, 1978
German Cup
Winners: 1969, 1973, 1979

Season by season

Notes

Team

Current roster

Individual awards

Notable players
To appear in this section a player must have either:
 Set a club record or won an individual award as a professional player.
 Played at least one official international match for his senior national team or one NBA game at any time.
 Achieved significant notability outside of basketball.
 Henning Harnisch (3 seasons: 1985–88)
 Heiko Schaffartzik (2 seasons: 2004–05, 2007–08)
 Anton Gavel (2 seasons: 2004–2006)
 Lance Blanks (1 season: 1994–1995)
 Louis Campbell (2 seasons: 2004–2006)
 Chuck Eidson (2 seasons: 2004–2006)
 Kevin Nash (1 season: 1980–1981)
 Diante Garrett (1 season: 2021)
 Nick Hornsby (born 1995)

Top scorers

References

External links
 

 
1966 establishments in West Germany
Basketball clubs in Hesse
Basketball teams established in 1966
Sport in Giessen